USS Triton may refer to:

, a tug in commission from 1889 to 1930
, a tug that served briefly during 1918
, a submarine commissioned in 1940 and sunk in 1943
, later SSN-586, a submarine in commission from 1959 to 1969

See also
 

United States Navy ship names